Ross Brewer (born 14 August 1953) is a former Australian rules footballer who played with Melbourne, Collingwood and Richmond in the Victorian Football League (VFL). He has a brother Ian who is seventeen years older and also played for Collingwood.

A strong marking forward, Brewer started his career at Melbourne and topped their goalkicking in 1973, 1974 and 1977. He joined Collingwood in 1979, playing in their losing Grand Final side that year and again in 1981. In 1982 and 1983 he played with Richmond before leaving the VFL. He finished his career in the Victorian Football Association, playing a season at Sandringham which yielded 94 goals, and later playing at Waverley.

References

External links

DemonWiki profile

1953 births
Living people
Melbourne Football Club players
Collingwood Football Club players
Richmond Football Club players
Sandringham Football Club players
Waverley Football Club players
Australian rules footballers from Victoria (Australia)